Eurowings GmbH is a German low-cost carrier headquartered in Düsseldorf and a wholly owned subsidiary of the Lufthansa Group. Founded in 1996, it serves a network of domestic and European destinations and formerly also operated some long-haul routes and maintains bases at several airports throughout Germany and Austria as well as in Palma de Mallorca and Pristina.

Eurowings has gone through a major transformation in recent years. It was part of Lufthansa Regional until October 2014. At that time it began operating on behalf of Germanwings within their network. Since spring 2015, Eurowings has been redeveloped into a low-cost airline for short- and long-haul flights. By October 2015, it had also started to incorporate Germanwings' route network as part of the merger of the two brands.

History

Early years
The airline was formed on 1 February 1990, following a merger of Nürnberger Flugdienst (NFD) and Reise- und Industrieflug (RFG), two commuter airlines based in Nürnberg and Dortmund, respectively. Flight operations using an initial fleet of ATR 42 and 72 aircraft inherited from Eurowings' predecessors were launched on 1 January 1994. Subsequently, BAe 146 aircraft were added to the fleet, which were later followed by larger Airbus A320 family aircraft and even an Airbus A310. Lufthansa took an initial 24,9% stake in Eurowings in 2001, increasing it to 49% in 2004. It has exercised full control of the airline since 2005 and assumed complete ownership in 2011.

Development as part of Lufthansa

As of 31 December 2006, Lufthansa had a 49% shareholding in Eurowings with a call option for 50.91% of the remaining stakes, bringing the company into the Lufthansa Group fold. At that time, Eurowings was the owner of Germanwings, thus creating a low-cost branch within the Lufthansa trust. Plans to merge these two airlines with TUIfly (controlled by TUI Travel) into a joint and independent holding company, were brought forth during 2008, but did not materialize. Instead, Lufthansa announced in December 2008 to acquire Germanwings from Eurowings.

In September 2010 Eurowings closed its headquarters and technical infrastructure in Dortmund, Germany, and moved both to Düsseldorf, where Eurowings operated most of its flights since the airline was part of Lufthansa Regional. In March 2011, the maintenance division at Nürnberg Airport was also closed.

In late 2013, Eurowings' short-haul flights that are not operated from Frankfurt or Munich were transferred from Lufthansa to Germanwings. All Eurowings flights operated on behalf of Lufthansa Regional ceased by autumn 2014 and were rebranded to Germanwings, the last ones to and from Düsseldorf.

Redevelopment into a low-cost carrier

In July 2014, the Lufthansa Group announced that Eurowings would replace its 23 Bombardier CRJ900 aircraft with 23 Airbus A320s. Ten of the A320s would be new orders, and 13 would be transferred from Lufthansa Group orders between February 2015 and March 2017. Lufthansa also announced Eurowings' transformation from a regional airline into a low-cost long and short-haul carrier by the end of 2015.

On 1 February 2015, Eurowings started operating the Airbus A320-200, after taking delivery of its first on 20 January, which was received from Lufthansa and repainted in Eurowings' new livery. This and further A320s would be operated on behalf of Germanwings for most of 2015, until Lufthansa consolidated its low-cost operations under the new Eurowings brand by end of that year. Additionally, in February 2015, the Lufthansa Group announced that SunExpress Deutschland would be the operator of Eurowings' new long-haul operations, which were to be based at Cologne Bonn Airport from November 2015. SunExpress Deutschland therefore would receive leased Airbus A330-200s.

Eurowings also announced the establishment of its first base outside of Germany, at Vienna International Airport, where the aircraft were planned be operated by Austrian Airlines under the Eurowings brand. Previous plans to establish the first foreign base at Basel/Mulhouse were cancelled. In June 2015, the Lufthansa Group announced the application for an additional Air operator's certificate (AOC) for Eurowings in Austria, called Eurowings Europe, under which all new Airbus A320-200s would be operated while the "current" German Eurowings would continue to operate the existing fleet. This was planned due to lower operational costs based on Austrian Airlines union agreements.

On 2 October 2015, Lufthansa announced a change of plans for their Vienna operations. Austrian Airlines would not operate some routes for the Eurowings brand as planned; instead, Eurowings Europe would handle all these flights itself. In October 2015, Eurowings took over 55 Germanwings routes. By April 2016, Eurowings had taken over several more routes. Eurowings has been solely responsible for all sales under the Germanwings brand since October 2015. From November 2015, Eurowings were offering one-way fares to destinations in the Caribbean and Thailand for as little as 99 euros. In December 2015, Eurowings' new long-haul operations faced severe criticism, as every fourth flight was delayed by an average of 5.8 hours, with some flights delayed more than 20 hours. Lufthansa stated that unexpected technical difficulties and a small fleet were to blame; Eurowings started its first seven long-haul routes with only one own aircraft. Shortly after, Eurowings again faced severe public outrage and negative media coverage, after one of their flights from Varadero to Cologne was delayed by more than 60 hours with passengers with visas whose validity had run out stuck in their hotels.

In January 2016, Eurowings cancelled their planned service from Cologne to Tehran, and reduced Dubai flights from year-round to seasonal service. Lufthansa also announced the establishment of a task force in the same month. Its brief would be to eliminate the operational problems which lead to serious delays and to increase operational reliability. In July 2016, it was made public that Eurowing's owner Lufthansa was considering taking over part of the route network, staff and aircraft leases from Air Berlin, which would then be made part of the Eurowings operations. In August 2016, Eurowings announced further changes to its long-haul operations. The routes to Boston and to Dubai, which had already been changed from year-round to seasonal, were terminated. Boston was only served for three months. Shortly after, Eurowings also announced it would terminate its last route to Moscow, and therefore Russia, due to low demand. Also in August 2016, Eurowings announced it would open its second Austrian base after Vienna, at Salzburg Airport, with flights to six European metropolitan destinations from January 2017. In December 2016, it was announced that Air Berlin would wet-lease a total of 38 Airbus A319/A320 aircraft for six years to Lufthansa Group's Eurowings (33 aircraft) and Austrian Airlines (five), starting from February 2017. As a result, Eurowings will phase out Germanwings' older A320s.

On 15 February 2017, Eurowings retired their last Bombardier CRJ900 after a flight from Karlsruhe to Hamburg. All CRJ900s have been handed over to Lufthansa CityLine and replaced by larger Airbus A320-200s, as part of the transformation from a regional into a low-cost carrier.

In February 2018, Eurowings announced the relocation of all its long-haul routes currently operated from Cologne Bonn Airport to Düsseldorf Airport, from which it already flies long-haul routes, by late October 2018 to strengthen their presence there. This leaves Düsseldorf and Munich Airport as Eurowings' long-haul bases.

Recent developments
In March 2019, the Lufthansa Group announced that starting in October 2019, Eurowings would introduce long-haul flights from Frankfurt Airport and further its Munich hub to expand Lufthansa's tourist-oriented presence and cooperation with these two hubs. It was announced that the original routes serviced from Frankfurt would be Mauritius, Barbados, and Windhoek, and Bangkok from Munich. However, in June 2019, the Lufthansa Group announced that Eurowings will drop all long-haul flights and instead focus on short-haul operations aboard Airbus A320-family aircraft. All long-haul flights operated by Eurowings will be transferred to other network airlines- Lufthansa, Brussels Airlines, Austrian Airlines, and Swiss. It was also announced that Brussels Airlines will work more closely with its network partners under a turnaround plan introduced by Lufthansa.

In April 2020, Lufthansa announced a major downsizing for Eurowings in the wake of the COVID-19 pandemic. While Germanwings has been shut entirely and Eurowings is to phase out several aircraft, most wetlease contracts have been ended on short notice. Amongst the terminated agreements was the largest one with German Airways (formerly LGW) for their entire Bombardier DHC-8-400 fleet.

In February 2021, Lufthansa announced it would take over most of Eurowings's routes at Munich Airport with the exception of few domestic services and flights to Palma de Mallorca and Pristina. Also in early 2021, Eurowings removed all of their long-haul destinations, which had been served from Düsseldorf, Munich and Frankfurt from their network. In the same time, parent Lufthansa announced the foundation of their new long-haul carrier Eurowings Discover.

In May 2022, Eurowings announced the termination of its own long-running frequent flyer program Boomerang Club in favor of a merger with Miles & More of parent Lufthansa.

Corporate affairs

Ownership and structure 
The Eurowings Group, which consists of low-cost or hybrid point-to-point airlines, is wholly owned by Lufthansa, and includes as subsidiaries:
 Eurowings GmbH, Düsseldorf, Germany
 Eurowings Europe GmbH, Vienna, Austria

Integration of Brussels Airlines within Eurowings was stopped during 2019; it will instead move closer to Lufthansa Network Airlines,
and report as part of that operating segment from 2020.

Business trends
The business and operating results of the Eurowings Group are fully incorporated into the Lufthansa Group accounts; key trends since 2015, when it moved towards the low cost model, are (as at year ending 31 December):

Destinations

Codeshare agreements
Eurowings has codeshare agreements with the following airlines:

 Air Canada
 All Nippon Airways
 Austrian Airlines
 Brussels Airlines
 Lufthansa
 Singapore Airlines
 Swiss International Air Lines
 TUI fly Deutschland
 United Airlines
 Volotea Airlines

Fleet

Current fleet
, Eurowings (excluding its subsidiary Eurowings Europe and the independently operating Eurowings Discover) operates the following aircraft:

Historical fleet
Over the years, Eurowings has operated the following aircraft types:

Special liveries 
As of May 2016, a Eurowings Airbus A320-200 (D-AIZR), has received a special black and yellow livery advertising the airline's sponsorship of Borussia Dortmund.
As of 2018, a Eurowings Airbus A320-200 (D-ABDQ), has been painted in a promotional Europa Park livery.
As of January 2019, a new Airbus A320-200 (D-ABDU), taken over from Air Berlin, received a new '100-years-of-Hertz'-special livery.

References

External links

  
 Official website of Eurowings Charter

Airlines of Germany
Companies based in North Rhine-Westphalia
Companies based in Düsseldorf
European Regions Airline Association
Airlines established in 1993
1993 establishments in Germany
German brands
Lufthansa Group
Low-cost carriers